Toni Lindberg (born 23 September 1985) is a Finnish football player currently playing for KooTeePee. He joined the Uzbek club Mash'al Mubarek in January 2012.

References

External links
  Profile at veikkausliiga.com
  Lindberg moved to Uzbek club Mashal in January 2012

1985 births
Living people
People from Ruotsinpyhtää
Finnish footballers
Myllykosken Pallo −47 players
Veikkausliiga players
Alta IF players
Finnish expatriate footballers
Expatriate footballers in Uzbekistan
Expatriate footballers in Norway
Finnish expatriate sportspeople in Norway
Association football defenders
Sportspeople from Uusimaa